is a passenger railway station located in the city of Tatsuno, Hyōgo Prefecture, Japan, operated by West Japan Railway Company (JR West).

Lines

Station layout
The station consists of two opposed ground-level side platforms connected by an elevated station building. The station has a Midori no Madoguchi staffed ticket office.

Platforms

History
Hon-Tatsuno Station opened on December 23, 1931.  With the privatization of the Japan National Railways (JNR) on April 1, 1987, the station came under the aegis of the West Japan Railway Company.

Passenger statistics
In fiscal 2019, the station was used by an average of 1945 passengers daily.

Surrounding area
Tatsuno Castle
Tatsuno City History and Culture Museum
Usukuchi Tatsuno Soy Sauce Museum

See also
List of railway stations in Japan

References

External links

 Station Official Site

Railway stations in Hyōgo Prefecture
Kishin Line
Railway stations in Japan opened in 1931
Tatsuno, Hyōgo